Anya Gallaccio (born 1963) is a British artist, who creates site-specific, minimalist installations and often works with organic matter (including chocolate, sugar, flowers and ice).

Her use of organic materials results in natural processes of transformation and decay, meaning that Gallaccio is unable to predict the end result of her installations. Something which at the start of an exhibition may be pleasurable, such as the scent of flowers or chocolate, would inevitably become increasingly unpleasant over time. The timely and site-specific nature of her work make it notoriously difficult to document. Her work therefore challenges the traditional notion that an art object or sculpture should essentially be a monument within a museum or gallery. Instead her work often lives through the memory of those that saw and experienced it - or the concept of the artwork itself.

Early life
Born in Paisley, Scotland, to TV producer George Gallaccio and actress Maureen Morris. She grew up in south west London, England and studied at Kingston Polytechnic (1984–85) and Goldsmiths College (1985–88). In 1988 Gallaccio exhibited in the Damien Hirst-curated Freeze exhibition, and in 1990 the Henry Bond and Sarah Lucas organised East Country Yard shows, which brought together many of the Young British Artists. Gallaccio is a professor in the Department of Visual Arts at the University of California, San Diego (UCSD).

Art practice

Much of her work uses organic materials, with fruit, vegetables and flowers all featuring in her work. Sometimes these materials undergo a change during the course of being exhibited. In Red on Green (1992), ten thousand rose heads placed on a bed of their stalks gradually withered as the exhibition went on. For Intensities and Surfaces (1996) Gallaccio left a thirty two ton block of ice with a salt core in the disused pump station at Wapping and allowed it to melt.

In a 2018 interview with Ocula Magazine, Gallaccio remarked of the YBA breakout exhibition Freeze "It feels just as precarious now as it did then. And I think it is good to constantly remind myself of that and not to get complacent. The bravado and the chutzpah of Freeze was impressive; it was more about a kind of attitude and that is something that has had reverberations."

She sometimes re-creates works. Her most well-known work Red on Green was originally made for her first solo showing in a public gallery, at the Institute of Contemporary Arts, London in 1992. It was then recreated ten years later for the exhibition Blast to Freeze: British Art in the 20th Century mounted by Kunstmuseum Wolfsburg in 2002 - 2003 and for the 2004 British Council exhibition Turning Points: 20th Century British Sculpture.

In Stoke 2004, Gallaccio coated an old farm building at Edinburgh's Jupiter Artland with almost 90 pounds of 70 percent cocoa, confectioner-quality chocolate. The work invited visitors to lick, touch, and stroke the walls.

preserve ‘beauty’  1991 - 2003 was an artwork which Gallaccio produced as a nominee for the 2003 Turner Prize. The installation consisted of a wall of gerbera daisies pinned behind a single sheet of glass. Behind glass, the flowers recall still-life and romantic landscape paintings, as well as flower arranging and pressing.

Other works by Gallaccio include Stroke (1993) in which benches in the gallery and cardboard panels attached to the walls were covered in chocolate, 
"Two Hundred Kilos of Apples Tied to a Barren Apple Tree", Atelier Amden, Amden, Switzerland (1999) and Because Nothing has Changed (2000), a bronze sculpture of a tree adorned with porcelain apples. Because I Could Not Stop (2002) is a similar bronze tree but with real apples which are left to rot.

At Houghton Hall in Norfolk, the Marquess of Cholmondeley commissioned a folly to the east of the great house. "The Sybil Hedge" is an "artlandish" folly. It is based on the signature of the marquis' grandmother, Sybil Sassoon.  Gallaccio has created a sarcophagus-like marble structure which is sited at the end of a path; and nearby is a copper-beech hedge which is planted in lines mirroring Sybil's signature.

2005 saw the publication of Anya Gallaccio: Silver Seed by Ridinghouse, which accompanied the artist's exhibition commissioned by the Mount Stuart Trust for an installation at Mount Stuart on the Isle of Bute, Scotland, UK .

Awards and acknowledgements
In 2006, she was listed on the Pink Power list of 100 most influential gay and lesbian people of 2006.

In 2003, Gallaccio was shortlisted for the Turner Prize alongside Grayson Perry, Jake and Dinos Chapman and Willie Doherty. One of her pieces for the show was preserve "beauty", 1991–2003, which was made from glass, fixings and 2,000 red gerberas.

Solo exhibitions

2015 
 Anya Gallaccio, Silas Marder Gallery, Bridgehampton, NY
 Anya Gallaccio, MCA San Diego, California, USA
 Anya Gallaccio, Lehmann Maupin, New York, USA

2014 
 Blum & Poe, Los Angeles, California
 STROKE, Jupiter Artland, Edinburgh, UK
 SNAP, Aldeburgh Festival, Snape Malting and Orford Ness, Suffolk, UK

2013 
 This Much is True, Hudson (Show)Room, Artpace, San Antonio, Texas

2012 
 The Light Pours Out of Me, Jupiter Artland, Edinburgh, UK
 Arthur's Seat, Ingleby Gallery, Edinburgh, UK

2011 
 highway, Annet Gelink Gallery, Amsterdam, Netherlands
 Where is Where it's at, Thomas Dane Gallery, London, UK
 Surf's Up, La Jolla, San Diego, California

2009 
 Four Galleries, Four Exhibitions, One Venue, Anya Gallaccio, 4x4, The Bluecoat, Liverpool, UK

2008 
 Anya Gallaccio: that open space within, Camden Arts Centre, London, UK
 Anya Gallaccio: Comfort and Conversation, Annet Gelink Gallery, Amsterdam, Netherlands

2007 
 Three Sheets To The Wind, Thomas Dane Gallery, London, UK
 Sybil, Houghton Hall, King's Lynn, UK

2006 
 Anya Gallaccio, Galeria Leme, São Paulo, Brazil
 One Art, Sculpture Center, New York

2005 
 Shadow on the Things You Know, Blum & Poe, Los Angeles, California
 Silver Seed, Mount Stuart, Isle of Bute, UK
 After the Gold Rush, collaboration with winemaker Zelma Long, initiated by New Langton Arts, San Francisco, California
 The Look of Things, Palazzo delle Papesse Centro Arte Contemporanea, Siena, Italy

2004 
 Love is only a feeling, Lehmann Maupin Gallery, New York

2003 
 Turner Prize Exhibition, Tate Britain, London, UK
 Anya Gallaccio, Ikon Gallery, Birmingham, UK
 Cast, limited edition sculpture commissioned by the Multiple Store, London UK
 Sometimes with one I love, Annet Gelink Gallery, Amsterdam, Netherlands

2002 
 beat, Duveen Sculpture Commission, Tate Britain, London, UK

2001 
 blessed, Lehmann Maupin Gallery, New York
 Absolut Gallacio, an event for Absolut Vodka, Butler's Wharf, London, UK

2000 
 now the leaves are falling fast, fig-1, London, UK
 Falling from grace, Annet Gelink Gallery, Amsterdam, Netherlands
 Falling from grace, Projektraum, Kunsthalle Bern, Berne, Switzerland

1999 
 All the rest is silence, Sadler's Wells, London, UK
 Glaschu, Tramway, Glasgow, UK

1998 
 Chasing Rainbows, Bloom Gallery, Amsterdam, Netherlands
 Two Sisters, Minerva Basin, Hull, UK
 Chasing Rainbows, Delfina, London, UK

1997 
 Anya Gallaccio, Blum & Poe, Los Angeles, California
 Keep off the grass, Serpentine Gallery Lawn, London, UK
 Anya Gallaccio, Artpace, San Antonio, Texas

1996 
 A Multiple, Ridinghouse Editions, London, UK
 Anya Gallaccio, Galerie Rodolphe Janssen, Brussels, Belgium
 Harvest of the winter months, Galerie im Künstlerhaus, Bremen, Germany
 Anya Gallaccio, Ars Futura Galerie, Zurich, Switzerland
 Intensities and Surfaces, Wapping Pumping Station, London, UK; commissioned by Women's Playhouse Trust

1995 
 Towards the Rainbow, Angel Row Gallery, Nottingham, UK
 Anya Gallaccio, Stephen Friedman Gallery, London, UK
 Anya Gallaccio, Francesca Sorace, Florence, Italy

1994 
 Anya Gallaccio, Blum & Poe, Los Angeles, California
 Anya Gallaccio, Filiale, Basel, Switzerland
 Anya Gallaccio, Karsten Schubert, London, UK
 La Dolce Vita, Stephania Miscetti, Rome, Italy

1993 
 Anya Gallaccio, Galerie Krinzinger, Vienna, Austria
 Anya Gallaccio, Ars Futura Galerie, Zurich, Switzerland
 Anya Gallaccio, Kim Light Gallery, Los Angeles, California

1992 
 Anya Gallaccio, Institute of Contemporary Art, London, UK

1991 
 Anya Gallaccio, Karsten Schubert, London, UK

Group exhibitions

2016 
 Terrain: Land Into Art, Hestercombe Gallery, Somerset UK
 Nature Morte, Bohuslans Museum, Uddevalla, Sweden

2015 
 About Trees, Zentrum Paul Klee, Bern, Switzerland
 Beyond Limits. Sotheby's at Chatsworth: A Selling Exhibition, Chatsworth, Derbyshire, UK
 Then For Now, Delfina Foundation, London, UK
 Future Seasons Past, Lehmann Maupin, New York, NY

2014 
 inSite: Cuatro ensayos de lo público, sobre otro escenario (Four rehearsals on that which is public, on another scenario), Cuernavaca, Mexico
 Phantoms in the Dirt, Museum of Contemporary Photography, Chicago, Illinois

2013 
 Creation / Destruction: Anya Gallaccio, Mark Lewis, Rut Blees Luxenburg, The Holden Gallery, Manchester, UK
 Tipping Point, Wolverhampton Art Gallery, Wolverhampton, UK
 Chasing Rainbows, Annet Gelink Gallery, Amsterdam, Netherlands
 The House of the Seven Gables, University Galleries, Illinois State University College of Fine Arts, Illinois

2012 
 Dissecting Nature, Quint Contemporary Art, La Jolla, California
 Green Acres: Artists Farming Fields, Greenhouses and Abandoned Lots, Contemporary Art Center, Richard & Lois Rosenthal Center for Contemporary Art, Cincinnati, Ohio; American University Museum, Washington DC (2013) and Arlington Art Center, Arlington, Virginia (2013)
 THIS THIS MONSTER THIS THINGS, Focal Point Gallery, Southend-on-Sea, UK

2010 
 On and On, La Casa Encendida, Madrid, Spain
 Alpha &, On Stellar Rays, New York
 Enel Contemporanea Award 2010, Macro Museum, Rome, Italy
 Eating the Universe: Food in Art, Kunsthalle Düsseldorf, Düsseldorf, Germany; Kunstmuseum Stuttgart, Stuttgart, Germany and Galerie im Taxispalais, Innsbruck, Austria

2009 
 Pot Luck: Food and Art, The New Art Gallery, Walsall, UK
 15th Anniversary Inaugural Exhibition, Blum & Poe, Los Angeles, California
 Radical Nature, Art and Architecture for a Changing Planet, The Barbican Centre, London, UK; Dick Institute, Kilmarnock, UK, the Baird Institute, Cumnock, UK, and The Doon Valley Museum, Cathcartson, UK
 Remote Proximity: Nature in Contemporary Art, Kunstmuseum Bonn, Bonn, Germany
 Flower Power, Villa Giulia, Centro Ricerca Arte Attuale, Verbania, Italy

2008 
 Living Flowers: Ikebana and Contemporary Art, Japanese American National Museum, Los Angeles, California
 Nature Interrupted, Chelsea Art Museum, New York
 Nina in Position, Artists Space, New York
 Martian Museum of Terrestrial Art, Barbican Centre, London, UK

2007 
 Apres la pluie, Musée départemental d'art contemporain de Rochechouart, Rochechouart, France
 Sparkle then Fade, Tacoma Art Museum, Tacoma, Washington

2006 
 Core, Illuminate Productions, Union Works, London, UK
 If it didn't exist you'd have to invent it... a partial Showroom history, The Showroom, London, UK
 Toutes Compositions Florales, Counter Gallery, London, UK

2005 
 Sad Songs, University Galleries, Illinois State University, Normal, Illinois
 Monuments for the USA, CCA Wattis Institute for Contemporary Arts, San Francisco, California and White Columns Gallery, New York

2004 
 Flowers observed, flowers transformed, Andy Warhol Museum, Pittsburgh, Pennsylvania
 Von Pop bis Heute, Das Grosse Fressen, Kunsthalle Bielefeld, Bielefeld, Germany
 Lustwarande 04: Disorientation by Beauty, Tilburg, The Netherlands
 Rose c'est la vie: On Flowers in Contemporary Art, Tel Aviv Museum of Art, Tel Aviv, Israel

2003 
 Micro/Macro: British Art 1996-2002, Mucsarnok Kunsthalle, Budapest, Hungary
 Purloined Nature, Kawamura Memorial Museum of Art, Sakura, Japan
 Look & Feel: Art Landscape Nature, De Verbeelding, Zeewolde, Netherlands

2002 
 Imagine, You Are Standing Here in Front of Me: Caldic Collection, Boijmans Van Beuningen Museum, Rotterdam, Netherlands
 Blast to Freeze: British Art in the 20th Century, Kunstmuseum Wolfsburg, Wolfsburg, Germany

2001 
 EGOFUGAL: Fugue from Ego for the Next Emergence, 7th International Istanbul Biennial, Istanbul Foundation for Culture and Arts, Istanbul, Turkey
 Pawel Althamer, Anya Gallaccio, Amden, Switzerland
 Arte y Naturaleza, Montenmedio Arte Contemporáneo, Cádiz, Spain
 Artline 5 (Interaktionen - Natur & Architektur), Borken, Germany

2000 
 Art in the Park, Compton Verney, Warwickshire, UK
 The Greenhouse Effect, Serpentine Gallery, London, UK
 The Invisible Touch, The Kunstraum Innsbruck, Innsbruck, Austria

1999 
 Releasing Senses, Opera City Art Gallery, Tokyo, Japan
 Viereck und Kosmos: Amdenener Rundang, Amden, Switzerland
 Do Paintings Dream of Veronese Green?, Elga Wimmer, New York, US

1998 
 Organic, Les Abattoirs, Toulouse, France
 Thinking Aloud, National Touring Exhibitions, Kettle's Yard, Cambridge, UK; Cornerhouse, Manchester, UK and Camden Arts Centre, London, UK
 Real/Life: New British Art, Tochigi Prefectural Museum, Tochigi, Japan; Fukuoka Art Museum, Fukuoka, Japan; Hiroshima City Museum, Hiroshima, Japan; Museum of Contemporary Art, Tokyo, Japan and Ashiya City Museum, Ashiya, Japan

1997 
 Der Verlorene Garten, Kunsthalle Palazzo, Liestral, Switzerland
 Material Culture: The Object in British Art of the 1980s and '90s, Hayward Gallery, London, UK
 Screen: 12 Artists from London, print portfolio published by Paragon Press, London, UK
 Habitat Print Portfolio Prints, published by Habitat, UK

1996 
 The Pleasure of Aesthetic Life, The Showroom, London, UK
 From Figure to Object: A Century of Sculptors' Drawings, Frith Street Gallery, London, UK, and Karsten Schubert, London, UK
 Private View: Contemporary British and German Artists, A New Collection for John and Josephine Bowes, The Bowes Museum, Barnard Castle, UK
 Time Wise, Swiss Institute, New York
 Be Me, Giorgio Sadotti at Interim Art, London, UK

1995 
 The British Art Show 4, National Touring Exhibitions, Castlefield Gallery, Manchester, UK and Royal Botanic Gardens, Edinburgh, UK
 Brilliant! New Art from London, Walker Arts Center, Minneapolis, Minnesota and Contemporary Arts Museum, Houston, Texas
 On Beauty, Regina Gallery, Moscow, Russia
 Where you were even now, Kunsthalle Winterthur, Winterthur, Switzerland
 Forest Floor, Chiltern Sculpture Trail, Oxford, UK

1994 
 Art Unlimited: Multiples of the 1960s and 1990s, National Touring Exhibitions, Centre for Contemporary Arts, Glasgow, UK and Southbank Centre, London, UK
 Le Shuttle, Künstlerhaus Bethanien, Berlin, Germany
 Sarah Staton Supastore Boutique, Laure Genillard Gallery, London, UK
 InSITE 94, Aqua Caliente, Tijuana, Mexico and Museum of Contemporary Art, San Diego, California
 Domestic Violence, Gio Marconi, Milan, Italy
 Shiny Nylon: Anya Gallacio, Deborah Levy and Kristina Page, King George v Dock, London, UK; commissioned by Women's Playhouse Trust

1993 
 Sarah Staton Supastore, Poster Studio, London, UK
 Le Jardin de la Vierge, Musée Instrumental, Brussels, Belgium
 Home Alone, Karsten Schubert, London, UK
 Le Principle de Réalité, Villa Arson, Nice, France
 Into the Blue, Bournemouth Festival, Bournemouth, UK
 A Dance Collaboration with Rosemary Butcher, Third Eye Centre, Glasgow, UK

1992 
 With Attitude, Galerie Rodolphe Janssen, Brussels, Belgium
 20 Fragile Pieces, Galerie Barbara et Luigi Polla, Geneva, Switzerland
 A Group Show, Barbara Gladstone Gallery, New York and Stein Gladstone Gallery, New York
 Life Size, small medium large, Centro per l'Arte Contemporanea Luigi Pecci, Prato, Italy
 15/1, Malania Basarab Gallery, London, UK

1991 
 Confrontaciones, Palacio de Velázquez, Madrid, Spain
 Rachel Evans, Anya Gallaccio, Bridget Smith, The Clove Building, London, UK
 Broken English, Serpentine Gallery, London, UK
 Museum of Installation Site Three, Surrey Docks, London, UK
 The Times: London's Young Artists, Art '91, Olympia, London, UK
 The Archive Project, Centre d'art Contemporain, Nevers, France

1990 
 Next Phase, Wapping Pumping Station, London, UK
 East Country Yard Show, Surrey Docks, London, UK

1989 
 The Drum Show, Broadgate Arena, London, UK
 New Year New Talent, Anderson O'Day, London, UK
 The Return of Ulysses, floor for the set of English National Opera, Coliseum, London UK

1988 
 Freeze, Surrey Docks, London, UK

References

External links
images of Gallaccio's work at Lehmann Maupin

1963 births
Living people
20th-century Scottish women artists
21st-century Scottish women artists
20th-century Scottish LGBT people
21st-century Scottish LGBT people
Alumni of Goldsmiths, University of London
Alumni of Kingston University
Artists from Paisley, Renfrewshire
British contemporary artists
Scottish lesbian artists
Scottish people of Italian descent
Young British Artists